Johnette Napolitano (born Jonette L. Napolitano; September 22, 1957) is an American musician best known as the lead vocalist, songwriter, and bassist for the alternative rock group Concrete Blonde.

Early life
Johnette Napolitano was born and raised in Los Angeles, California, the eldest of five children in an Italian American family.

Her parents recognized their daughter possessed musical talent when, as a child, she was able to play "Somewhere Over the Rainbow" on piano by ear. Her mother loved show tunes. The family also listened to Johnny Cash, Marty Robbins, and the Rat Pack. At age five she enrolled in a gifted kids art program at UCLA.

Concrete Blonde 

In 1986, Napolitano co-founded Concrete Blonde with guitarist James Mankey. She sang and sometimes played bass guitar. The pair had worked together under a variety of names since 1982. They released seven studio albums between 1986 and 2004, and one additional album as a collaboration with Los Illegals. Concrete Blonde had several moderately successful singles, including "God is a Bullet", "Joey", "Tomorrow Wendy", and a version of "Everybody Knows" originally by Leonard Cohen.

Concrete Blonde broke up and reformed several times, with Napolitano and Mankey as the only constant members. The band has not been active since 2012.

Solo career 
She has recorded as a solo artist, with the albums Sketchbook (2002), Sketchbook 2 (2006), Scarred (2007), and Sketchbook 3 (2010). Napolitano also recorded a solo album titled Sound of a Woman around 1996–1997, and performed many of the songs on a solo tour opening for Paul Weller. The album was set to be released on IRS (a subdivision of Island Records), the label of her old band, Concrete Blonde. 1997–1998 was a bad time for Island, starting with the sudden departure of founder-CEO Chris Blackwell and ending with the total reorganization of the label. Sound of a Woman was, effectively, lost in the shuffle, and at this point is unlikely to ever be officially released. Bootleg copies of this album are rare and highly valued. 

Before Concrete Blonde, Napolitano was a member of Dream 6, who released their self-titled debut EP in 1983.

In addition to Concrete Blonde, Napolitano was involved with several musical project including Vowel Movement, a semi-improvisational musical collaboration with Holly Beth Vincent; and Pretty & Twisted, a band that also featured former Wall of Voodoo guitarist Marc Moreland.

She is one of several vocalists featured on the 1996 album No Talking, Just Head, by The Heads, including the single "Damage I've Done". The group was formed by three members of Talking Heads (Jerry Harrison, Chris Frantz and Tina Weymouth). Napolitano was the primary vocalist for The Head's only concert tour. The Heads was originally intended to become a full-time band, with further studio albums and tours. A live CD-video of the first tour was planned, featuring performances from many of the album's guest artists and Napolitano on vocals for the songs originally recorded by Talking Heads. David Byrne sued the band, saying their name and presentation was too evocative of Talking Heads. The suit was settled out of court, and The Heads ceased activity.  

As of 2009, Napolitano lived in Joshua Tree, California.
She composes music for films and works as a gallery artist, specializing in working with discarded and reclaimed materials. She also cares for rescue horses.

Non-Concrete Blonde discography 
 Johnette Napolitano and Holly Vincent Vowel Movement (1995, Mammoth Records)
 Pretty & Twisted (1995, Warner Bros. Records)
 Sketchbook (2002, independently released)
 Johnette Napolitano and Buzz Gamble "Cheap Tequila" single (2004, independently released)
 Sketchbook 2 (2005, independently released)
 Scarred (2007, Hybrid Recordings)
 Sketchbook 3 (2009, Happy Hermit/independently released)
 Naked (2015, EP, independently released)
 The Naked Album (2015, independently released)
 Exquisite Corpses (2022, Schoolkids Records)

Other projects 
She has contributed music to many films, including the 2006 Australian film Candy, and "Suicide Note" from Underworld. The following films and TV programs also feature songs performed by Concrete Blonde:
 The Texas Chainsaw Massacre 2 (1986)
 The Hidden (1987)
 Pump Up the Volume (1990)
 Beverly Hills, 90210 (1990, TV) – "One Man and a Baby" episode
 Point Break (1991)
 Me, Myself and I (1992)
 Beavis and Butt-Head (1993, TV) – "Blood Drive" episode
 Jimmy Hollywood (1994)
 Girls in Prison (1994; TV)
 Losing Isaiah (1995)
 Deadly Love (1995; TV)
 Passions (1999)
 The Sopranos (1999; TV) – "Calling all cars" episode
 The Great (TV series) (2020) - "A Simple Jape" episode

Soundtrack:
 Dead Silence (2007; "Who's Holding You Now?")
 Candy (2006; "Wedding Theme From Candy")
 The Third Watch (2004; Season 5, Episode 17)
 The Sopranos – "Nobody Knows Anything" (1999; "Highs Are Too High")
 Foxfire (1996; "Dancing Barefoot")
 The Basketball Diaries (1995; "Dancing Barefoot")

Composer:
 West (2007)
 Pep Squad (1998)

Actress:
 Cry Radio (1998) – Narrator

In 1996, Napolitano produced an album by Australian group In Vivo.

Napolitano collaborated with Danny Lohner (Nine Inch Nails, A Perfect Circle, Black Light Burns) on the horror film Dead Silence. The pair had successfully collaborated previously for the films Underworld and Wicker Park.

Napolitano contributed vocals to an album by John Trudell, and performs backing vocals in "Struck a Nerve" by Bad Religion on the Recipe For Hate album.

Napolitano performed the main vocals on the score of the Australian film West, written and directed by Daniel Krige. She also sang the title song, "Falling in Love".

Napolitano also performed the duet "My Little Problem" with Paul Westerberg on The Replacements "All Shook Down" release.

Napolitano provided vocals on the track "I Am Where it Takes Me" by metal band Black Light Burns.

Napolitano is credited as co-writer of the Ashes Divide song "Too Late".

Napolitano wrote and sang, with Steve Wynn, the song "Conspiracy of the Heart" included in the Steve Wynn's album Kerosene Man (1990).

Pretty & Twisted 
Johnette Napolitano joined Marc Moreland and Danny Montgomery to form Pretty & Twisted in 1995. Their self-titled debut, Pretty & Twisted, was produced by Napolitano and released on Warner Brother Records, Inc.

The track listing for the album was:
 "The Highs Are Too High" – 6:10
 "Mother of Pearl" – 5:05 (Bryan Ferry)
 "Souvenir" – 5:09
 "No Daddy No" – 4:34
 "iRide!" – 3:40
 "Train Song (Edge of Desperation)" – 6:30
 "Stranger" – 2:59 (Paul Westerberg, Johnette Napolitano)
 "Singing is Fire" – 3:11 (Lyrics by Charles Bukowski)
 "Don't Take Me Down" – 4:37
 "Come Away With Me" – 5:55 (words: Janis Joplin, music: Johnette Napolitano)
 "Dear Marlon Brando" – 3:30
 "Billy" – 3:39
 "Watching the Water" – 4:17

Scarred 
Napolitano's solo album Scarred was released on May 28, 2007, on the label Hybrid Recordings.

Scarred track list
 "Amazing" – 4:08
 "The Scientist" – (Coldplay cover, with Danny Lohner) – 5:07
 "Scarred" – 4:09
 "Poem for the Native" – 5:19
 "My Diane" – 5:01
 "Just Like Time" – 4:41
 "Save Me" – 3:19
 "Like a Wave" – 4:41
 "Crazy Tonight" – 5:26
 "Everything for Everyone" – 4:56
 "All Tomorrow's Parties" – (The Velvet Underground cover) – 3:40
 "I'm Up Here" – 4:27

Personal life 
Though raised irreligious, Napolitano converted to Roman Catholicism as an adult.

References

External links

1957 births
Living people
American contraltos
American people of Italian descent
American rock bass guitarists
American women rock singers
Catholics from California
Concrete Blonde members
Converts to Roman Catholicism
People from Hollywood, Los Angeles
People from Joshua Tree, California
Women bass guitarists
20th-century American bass guitarists
21st-century American women singers
20th-century American women musicians
Mammoth Records artists
Warner Records artists
21st-century American singers